The 20th century of the Common Era began on 1 January 1901 and ended on 31 December 2000, according to the Gregorian calendar.

20th century may also refer to:
20th century BC

Film and theatre
20th Century Studios, a film studio formerly known as 20th Century Fox
Twentieth Century Pictures, one of the predecessors of 20th Century Studios (along with Fox Film)
Twentieth Century (play), a 1932 Broadway play
Twentieth Century (film), a 1934 American comedy
 On the Twentieth Century, a 1978 musical based on the play and film
The Twentieth Century, the 1957–1970 television series
20th Century with Mike Wallace, the 1990s–2000s television series
The Twentieth Century (film), a 2019 film by Matthew Rankin
20th Century Girl, a 2022 film by Bang Woo-ri

Music
20th Century Records, a record label begun as a soundtrack division of Twentieth Century Pictures
20th Century, a sub-unit of Japanese boyband V6
Twentieth Century (Cold Chisel album), 1984, or the title song
Twentieth Century (Alabama album), 1999, or the title song
20th Century (3X Krazy album)
20th Century (John Sykes album)
"Twentieth Century", a song by Pet Shop Boys from Fundamental

Other
Twentieth Century (typeface), a sans-serif typeface
20th Century (cocktail), a gin cocktail
Twentieth Century Motor Car Corporation, a failed automobile company
The Twentieth Century (periodical), a continuation of The Nineteenth Century (periodical)
XXth Century, Nazi Germany-funded journal in Shanghai published by Klaus Mehnert

See also
20th Century Studios, a movie and television production company
20th Century Limited, the flagship passenger train of the New York Central Railroad